The West Texas Warbirds are a professional indoor football team and a member of National Arena League. The Warbirds are based in Odessa, Texas, with home games at the Ector County Coliseum. The team was originally a member of Champions Indoor Football, but never played a league game due to the COVID-19 pandemic.

History
The Warbirds are the third arena/indoor football team based in Odessa, following the Odessa/West Texas Roughnecks (2004–2012) and the West Texas Wildcatters (2014).

On October 2, 2019, Champions Indoor Football (CIF) announced an expansion team to be based in Odessa for the 2020 season with the team planning to represent West Texas and use it in their team name. A name-the-team contest was held, with Warbirds being announced as the team's name on December 18, beating the "Warriors," "Law," "Outlawz", and "Thunder" in the contest.

The Warbirds' planned inaugural 2020 season was cancelled due to the onset of the COVID-19 pandemic. The CIF then delayed the 2021 season, but the local capacity and interstate travel restrictions in Texas led the Warbirds and the Amarillo Venom to withdraw from participating in the 2021 CIF season. The Venom and Warbirds instead launched the Lone Star Series, a series of games between the two CIF Texas teams and a few other Texas-based semiprofessional teams.  The Warbirds defeated the Venom, 79–60 to claim the Lone Star Series championship.

Amarillo and West Texas officially left the CIF and turned their Lone Star Series from the previous season into the Arena Football Association (AFA) in November 2021. The new league also announced its initial membership consisting of former Lone Star Series member Texas Jets, former American Arena League champions North Texas Bulls, the dormant Rio Grande Valley Dorados, and the Texas Crude.

Season-by-season

Current roster

Notes

External links
 Official website

Champions Indoor Football teams
American football teams in Texas
Sports in Odessa, Texas
American football teams established in 2019
2019 establishments in Texas